Rubus racemiger is an uncommon North American species of brambles in the rose family. It grows in the eastern United States, in the Appalachian Mountains of Pennsylvania, Maryland, and West Virginia.

The genetics of Rubus is extremely complex, so that it is difficult to decide on which groups should be recognized as species. There are many rare species with limited ranges such as this. Further study is suggested to clarify the taxonomy.

References

External links

racemiger
Plants described in 1947
Flora of the Eastern United States